Atraric acid is a naturally occurring phenolic compound and ester with the IUPAC name methyl 2,4-dihydroxy-3,6-dimethylbenzoate and molecular formula C10H12O4. It occurs in the root-bark of Pygeum africanum and Evernia prunastri (Oakmoss). There is evidence to suggest that it has antiandrogenic activity in humans and its use in treatment of benign prostate hyperplasia, prostate cancer, and spinal and bulbar muscular atrophy has been investigated.

References

Other sources 
 Fungal Associations – Google Books. p. 312.
 Watts' dictionary of chemistry - Henry Watts, Henry Forster Morley, Matthew Moncrieff Pattison Muir - Google Books. p. 361.
 Alternative and Complementary Therapies for Cancer: Integrative Approaches ... - Google Books. p. 489.
 

Salicylate esters
Methyl esters
Nonsteroidal antiandrogens